The Borsod-Abaúj-Zemplén County Assembly is the local legislative body of Borsod-Abaúj-Zemplén County in the Northern Hungary, in Hungary.

Composition

2019–2024 period
The Assembly elected at the 2019 local government elections, is made up of 29 counselors,  with the following party composition:

After the elections in 2019 the Assembly controlled by the Fidesz–KDNP party alliance which has 18 councillors, versus 8 Jobbik-Hungarian Socialist Party (MSZP)-Momentum Movement-Everybody's Hungary Movement (MMM) and 3 Democratic Coalition (DK) councillors.

2014–2019 period
The Assembly elected at the 2014 local government elections, is made up of 29 counselors, with the following party composition:

After the elections in 2014 the Assembly controlled by the Fidesz–KDNP party alliance which has 15 councillors, versus 8 Jobbik, 5 Hungarian Socialist Party (MSZP) and 1 Democratic Coalition (DK) and councillors.

2010–2014 period
The Assembly elected at the 2010 local government elections, is made up of 30 counselors, with the following party composition:

After the elections in 2010 the Assembly controlled by the Fidesz–KDNP party alliance which has 17 councillors, versus 7 Jobbik and 6 Hungarian Socialist Party (MSZP) councillors.

Presidents of the Assembly
So far, the presidents of the Borsod-Abaúj-Zemplén County Assembly have been:

 1990–1998 György Szabó, Hungarian Socialist Party (MSZP)
 1998–2002 Ferenc Ódor, Fidesz
 2002–2006 Ildikó Gyárfás, Hungarian Socialist Party (MSZP)
 2006–2010 Ferenc Ódor, Fidesz–KDNP
 2010–2014 Roland Mengyi, Fidesz–KDNP
 2014–2019 Dezső Török, Fidesz–KDNP
 since 2014 Boglárka Bánné Gál, Fidesz–KDNP

References

Local government in Hungary
Borsod-Abaúj-Zemplén County